Bobby is the debut studio album of When People Were Shorter and Lived Near the Water, released in 1989 by Shimmy Disc. It was re-issued on CD with six additional songs.

Track listing

Personnel
Adapted from Bobby liner notes.

When People Were Shorter and Lived Near the Water
 David Licht – drums
 Robert Meetsma – lap steel guitar, cornet, vocals
 Kim Rancourt – vocals
 David Raymer – pinao, guitar, vocals
 Dave Rick – bass guitar, vocals

Additional musicians
 Nick Collins – trombone
 Paul Defilipps – vocals
 Frank London – trumpet
 Robert Poss – guitar
 Jeff Schoen – organ
 Steve Shelley – percussion
 Ron Spitzer – guitar
 Chris Xefos – tuba, accordion
Production and additional personnel
 Tom Cinoman – photography
 Kramer – production, bass guitar, slide guitar
 Sue Fisher – engineering

Release history

References

External links 
 

1989 debut albums
Albums produced by Kramer (musician)
When People Were Shorter and Lived Near the Water albums
Shimmy Disc albums
Psychedelic pop albums
Psychedelic rock albums by American artists
Pop rock albums by American artists